The Nokia C3-00 is a QWERTY keypad feature phone with Nokia Series 40 mobile operating system released under the Cseries line of phones by Nokia. It features a full 4-line QWERTY keyboard, like the earlier Nokia 6800 series. It was advertised as an entry-level messaging and social networking phone, retailing at 90 euros before taxes. It was introduced on 13 April 2010 alongside the Nokia E5 and C6.

Features
The Nokia C3 is installed with Ovi Mail and Ovi Chat, where users can set up email and chat accounts straight from the device. It features push mail and SMS, including access to Facebook and Twitter directly from the home. The C3-00 also has a 2-megapixel fixed-focus camera, built-in Wi-Fi, 2.4-inch QVGA screen, 55 MB of internal memory, 8 GB of expandable storage via MicroSD card, and basic 2G connectivity. The phone comes with a Nokia BL-5J 1320 mAh battery.

Specification

Issues
Issues are being reported by users regarding WLAN connectivity. YouTube videos do not play on WLAN on some handsets. Also, this handset supports Bluetooth 2.1, but the A2DP profile isn't supported by the phone software, resulting in any stereo headset not being recognized. It also has issues regarding call logs.

References

http://www.gsmarena.com/nokia_c3-review-494.php

External links
Nokia C3-00 :: The Definitive WLAN Guide 
Nokia C3-00 software version 
Nokia C3 WLAN Problem (BUG) Solution

Mobile phones with an integrated hardware keyboard
C3
Mobile phones introduced in 2010
Mobile phones with user-replaceable battery

es:Nokia C3
fi:Nokia C3 Touch and Type